The Roman Catholic Archdiocese of Santiago de Cuba (erected 1518 as the Diocese of Baracoa) is a Metropolitan Archdiocese, responsible for the dioceses of Guantánamo-Baracoa, Holguín and Santísimo Salvador de Bayamo y Manzanillo.

The diocese's name was changed to the Diocese of Santiago de Cuba. It was a suffragan of the Archdiocese of Seville in Spain until 12 February 1546 when it became a suffragan of the Diocese of Santo Domingo (now Archdiocese of Santo Domingo) in the Dominican Republic. In 1803, the see was elevated to an archdiocese.  The archdiocese is the home of the Basílica Santuario Nacional de Nuestra Señora de la Caridad del Cobre.

Bishops

Diocese of Baracoa
Erected: 1518
Juan de Witte Hoos, O.P. (1517–1525) Resigned

Diocese of Santiago de Cuba
Name Changed: 28 April 1522
Latin Name: Sancti Iacobi in Cuba

Archdiocese of Santiago de Cuba
Elevated: 24 November 1803

Mariano Rodríguez de Olmedo y Valle (1824–1831) Died
Cirilo de Alameda y Brea, O.F.M. (1831–1849) Died
St. Antonio María Claret y Clará, C.M.F. (1850–1859)
Manuel María Negueruela Mendi (1859–1861) Died
Primo Calvo y López (1861–1868) Died
José María Martín de Herrera y de la Iglesia (1875–1889) Appointed, Archbishop of Santiago de Compostela
José María Cos y Macho (1889–1892) Appointed, Archbishop (Personal Title) of Madrid
Francisco Sáenz de Urturi y Crespo, O.F.M. (1894–1899) Resigned
Francisco de Paula Barnada y Aguilar (1899–1913) Died 
Felix Ambrosio Guerra, S.D.B. (1915–1925) Resigned
Valentín Zubizarreta y Unamunsaga, O.C.D. (1925–1948) Died
Enrique Pérez Serantes (1948–1968) Died
Pedro Claro Meurice Estiu (1970–2007) Retired
 (Dionisio Guillermo García Ibáñez) (2007–present)

Auxiliary bishops
Dionisio Resino (Rezino) y Ormachea, O.S.B. (1705-1711)
José Francisco Martínez de Tejada y Díez de Velasco, O.F.M. (1732-1745), appointed Bishop of Yucatán (Mérida), México
Pedro Ponce y Carrasco (1746-1762), appointed Bishop of Quito, Ecuador
Santiago José Hechavarría y Elguesúa (1768-1769), appointed Bishop here
Francisco Antonio Pablo Sieni Flannings, O.F.M. Cap. (1784-1787), appointed Auxiliary Bishop of San Cristobal de la Habana
Pedro Claro Meurice Estiu (1967-1970), appointed Archbishop here

Other priests of this diocese who became bishops
Luis Ignatius Peñalver y Cárdenas, appointed Bishop of Louisiana and the Two Floridas (Saint Louis of New Orleans), USA in 1794
Carlos Riu Anglés, appointed Bishop of Camagüey in 1948
Francisco Ricardo Oves Fernández, appointed Auxiliary Bishop of Cienfuegos in 1969
Carlos Jesús Patricio Baladrón Valdés, appointed Auxiliary Bishop of San Cristobal de la Habana in 1991
Silvano Herminio Pedroso Montalvo, appointed Bishop of Guantánamo-Baracoa in 2018

Territorial losses

The see also gained territory in 1527 with the suppression of the Diocese of Concepción de la Vega.

External links and references

Havana puts on New Face for Pope by Phillip True, Express News, January 21, 1998

Santiago de Cuba
Santiago de Cuba
1518 establishments in the Spanish Empire
Santiago de Cuba
A